"Look Me in the Heart" is a song by recording artist Tina Turner. It was written by Billy Steinberg and Tom Kelly and produced by Dan Hartman for Turner's seventh solo studio album, Foreign Affair (1989). Released as a single in March 1990, it reached number 23 on the Irish Singles Chart and number 31 in the United Kingdom. In the United States, it peaked at number eight on the Billboard Adult Contemporary chart. The single was released in a variety of formats, including a live recording of the Private Dancer track "Steel Claw", remixes of "Look Me in the Heart" and the 1987 "Tina Turner Montage Mix", a nine-minute megamix including tracks from Private Dancer and Break Every Rule.

Critical reception
Bill Coleman from Billboard wrote, "Soul-drenched popper should be embraced by several formats. From the underappreciated Foreign Affair album." Greg Kot from Chicago Tribune felt "Look Me in the Heart" "bears an uncanny resemblance" to her earlier cover of Al Green's soul classic "Let's Stay Together". In an retrospective review, Pop Rescue declared it as a "pretty standard little pop song", that "lacks anything more than another saxophone solo and some breathy synths as interest points."

Track listings
 US 7-inch and cassette single, Australian 7-inch single
 "Look Me in the Heart" – 3:42
 "Stronger Than The Wind" – 3:59

 French 7-inch and UK 7-inch and cassette single
 "Look Me in the Heart" – 3:42
 "Steel Claw" (live) – 4:41

 French CD single
 "Look Me in the Heart" – 3:42
 "Steel Claw" (live) – 4:25
 "The Best" (Extended Mighty mix) – 6:37

 UK CD single
 "Look Me in the Heart" (L.P. version) – 3:42
 "Look Me in the Heart" (12-inch remix) – 5:22
 "Steel Claw" (live) – 4:25
 "Look Me in the Heart" (instrumental) – 3:39

 UK CD single limited
 "Look Me in the Heart" (7-inch remix) – 3:44
 "Look Me in the Heart" (instrumental) – 3:41
 "The Tina Turner Montage Mix" – 8:54

 UK 12-inch single
 "Look Me in the Heart" (12-inch remix) – 5:22
 "Steel Claw" (live) – 4:25
 "Look Me in the Heart" (instrumental) – 3:39

Charts

Weekly charts

Year-end charts

Release history

References

Tina Turner songs
1990 singles
1989 songs
Capitol Records singles
Song recordings produced by Dan Hartman
Songs written by Billy Steinberg
Songs written by Tom Kelly (musician)